In the field of oenology, the French term fine (high quality) identifies and refers to high quality brandy, usually of an Appellation d'Origine Contrôlée (AOC), such as Cognac and Armagnac. The varieties of fine include, Fine de Bordeaux, Fine de Bourgogne, and Fine de la Marne.

In popular culture
In the works of  Ernest Hemingway, the characters speak of their gastronomic adventures in drinking and eating:

In the novel The Sun Also Rises (1926):
 
 "We had  dined  at  l'Avenue's, and afterward went to the Café  de Versailles for coffee. We had several fines after the coffee. . . ."

and: 

 "After the coffee and a fine we got the bill, chalked up, the same as ever, on a slate. . . ."

In the spy movie Goldfinger (1964), in an after-dinner scene with the head of the Bank of England and M:

 James Bond is offered a second pouring of what his host, Col. Smithers, describes as a "rather disappointing brandy." Unclear on his host's meaning, M asks Col. Smithers "What's wrong with it?", and Bond replies, "I'd say it's a thirty-year-old fine, indifferently blended . . . with an overdose of bon bois." 

Bond's oenological reference, bon bois, is about a potent cognac [brandy] from the  a region of Cognac in the south-west of France.

Brandies